RajadhiRaja is a 2014 Malayalam-language action thriller film, directed by Ajai Vasudev and written by the duo of Udayakrishna-Siby K. Thomas. The film stars Mammootty and Siddique, alongside an ensemble supporting cast including Joju George, Raai Laxmi, Mukesh Khanna, Raza Murad, Sijoy Varghese, Rahul Dev, Nawab Shah and Joy Mathew.

The film released on 5 September 2014 to mixed reviews.

Plot
The story begins in Chittur district of Palakkad in Kerala. The story is about Ayyappan who is a petty thief who visits his relative Shekarankutty, who is a gas station owner leading a happy family life with his wife Radha and his daughter Sreedurga. One day, Shekarankutty is arrested by the police on suspicion of him being a crime boss called Raja in Mumbai. But as the police could not confirm that he was the suspect, he is set free. That following night, Shekarankutty and his family are attacked by a group of gangsters whom Ayyappan had a fight once. The next day they shift their house. As Shekarankutty and Ayyappan go to meet the police commissioner, they are followed by the same gang that attacked them. As they are rounded up, Ayyappan tries to flee but stops when seeing Shekarankutty beating up them. It was revealed the police's suspicions were right and he was Raja.

After the fight, Shekarankutty reveals to Ayyappan about his past as a mercenary. He reveals that he came to Mumbai to become a businessperson but instead got a job as a taxi driver where he met his boss Krishna Vamsi who offered a life in the Indian underworld to gain money and fame. He killed Radha's brother Chandru, who was one of Vamshi's men in attempt of saving Chief Secretary Mahindra Varma's daughter who gets kidnapped. Varma was his old friend who changed him and gave a new life. In the police records it was given that Raja was killed by the police and Chandru escaped from the custody. Varma tells Shekarankutty to not come to Mumbai again and he makes a  report to prove that he didn't go anywhere leaving his hometown. Radha and her family were unaware that Shekarankutty killed Chandru.

In present day Shekarankutty is threatened by Vamshi, that his family will be killed. However, he manages to save his family in the nick of time. Later, he is sent by his former boss to kill Varma who is the Chief secretary in Coimbatore in Tamil Nadu on the occasion of  Varma's daughter's wedding. But as Shekarankutty is indebted to  Varma for the help he had done to Shekharankutty in the past, Shekarankutty can never kill Varma. But as Shekarankutty's boss and his associates are adamant on killing Varma, they take Shekarankutty's family hostage and threaten to kill them unless Mahindra Varma is brought to them. Mahindra Varma says he too loves his family, as Shekarankutty does.

Finally, Shekarankutty brings Mahindra Varma to Ahmed Shah, but Shekarankutty reveals that he killed Vamshi before coming to the place with the help of his friend Sikandar whose family gets killed by Vamshi and his men in a bomb blast. Shah and his men try to kill the Varma but in a fight that ensues, Shah and his men gets killed by Shekarankutty thus Varma gets saved. Later it is seen that Shekarankutty living a happy life with his family hiding his past only known to Ayyappan.

Cast

 Mammootty as Rajashekharan Kutty (Rajashekharan alias Raja)
 Raza Murad as Krishna Vamshi
 Mukesh Khanna as Sikhander
 Joy Mathew as Ahmed Shah, the main antagonist
 Siddique as Mahendra Varma IAS, Chief Secretary 
 Joju George as Ayyappan
 Raai Laxmi as Radha
 Nawab Shah as Gangster Sathya
 Rahul Dev as John Tiger
 Sijoy Varghese as Gangster Chandru
 Babu Namboothiri as Gangadhara Menon, Radha's Father
 Lena as Vidyalakshmi 
 Bheeman Raghu as DYSP Paulose Pothen
 Abu Salim as Security Officer Sandeep
 Kazan Khan as Gangster Khalid
 Ravi Prakash as Police Officer Devilal Patel
 Assim Jamal as Gangster
 Taniya Stanley as Ammu, Mahendra Varma's daughter
 Nelson as Kuttappan
 Shaju as Man fighting at Petrol pump
 Sethulakshmi as Paruttiyamma
 Baiju VK as CI George
Baby Eva as Sreedurga
Baby Karen Mejo as Mahendra Varma's little daughter
 Unni Mukundan as Mahendra varma's son in law (cameo appearance in the song "Kanninu Kannin")
 Shamna Kasim as dancer (cameo appearance in the song  "Dhan Than" )

Soundtrack 
Two songs were composed by Karthik Raja and one song ("Midumidukkan") was composed by the duo Berny–Ignatius.

Critical reception
Sify  said, "Rajadhi Raja is a mimicry of some tasteless masala flicks, which are seriously outdated. This one has perhaps been aimed at the hardcore fans of the superstar." IndiaGlitz gave six out of ten and said, "Rajadhiraja is an Average Thriller" and stated, "In the final analysis, 'Rajadhiraja' doesn't offer any freshness in narratives. But it can be fine for a one-time watch, if you are not in theatres with any big expectations." Paresh C Palicha of Rediff gave two stars out of five with a caption, "Rajadhi Raja fails to impress", and wrote, "Rajadhi Raja proves to be a lacklustre Onam release" Unni R Nair of Kerala9 gave two out of five and stated, "Just about good entertainment watchable if you know what to expect..." Deepa Soman of The Times of India gave 3.5 out of 5 and said, "Rajadhiraja is a winsome film with enough moments to entertain you this Onam season."

Box office

References

External links
 

2014 films
2010s Malayalam-language films
2010s masala films
Indian gangster films
Indian action drama films
Films shot in Palakkad
Films shot in Coimbatore
Films shot in Mumbai
Films scored by Berny–Ignatius
Films scored by Karthik Raja
2014 action drama films
Films directed by Ajai Vasudev